Anna Maree Harrison  (née Scarlett; born 15 April 1983 in Westport, New Zealand) is a New Zealand netball and beach volleyball player. She stands at 1.87 m (6 ft 2 in). In netball Harrison plays as goal-keep, goal-defence and/or wing-defence.

Anna Maree used to play netball and basketball in winter and played beach and indoor volleyball during summer when she was in a boarding high school. She was raised in Karamea on the South Island's west coast and in 2002 joined the New Zealand national netball team, the Silver Ferns, travelling to the Commonwealth Games with the team as a training player. She went on to earn 39 caps in the Silver Ferns by the end of 2006. but was not selected for the 2007 World Netball Championships squad, subsequently retiring from netball to focus on beach volleyball, partnering with Susan Blundell.

After several years on the international beach volleyball circuit, Harrison left the sport in 2010 and announced her intention to return to netball. She signed with the Northern Mystics for the 2011 ANZ Championship  season, and also regained her place in the Silver Ferns lineup for 2010. She made the team for the 2010 Commonwealth Games, where she was used in the Wing Defence position throughout the pool games. She was not named in the starting line-up for the final, but was injected into the game at half time, in the unfamiliar WD position, and helped to turn around the deficit and win the gold medal.

During the 2012 ANZ Championship season, Anna was married to sports scientist Craig Harrison. She made the Silver Ferns again in 2012, and was used mainly in WD, to cover the loss of Joline Henry.

In the 2012 ANZ Championship season, Harrison was lifted up by her teammate in order to successfully block a shot above the rim, during the round 8 match against the Melbourne Vixens. It was pulled off two more times in the game. The controversial move was dubbed the 'Harrison Hoist' by the media, and attracted a massive response from fans and casual netball followers, many believing the move should be banned. She has performed this move several times since, including on the international scene.

In February 2013, Harrison announced that she was three months pregnant and did not take part in the 2013 ANZ Championship.

On 1 September 2013, Anna gave birth to her and Craig's first child, a son, Isaac and in 2015 gave birth to a daughter, Georgia.

Harrison announced her retirement in 2018. Harrison came out of retirement to play for Northern Stars in the 2021 ANZ Premiership season.

In the 2023 New Year Honours, Harrison was appointed a Member of the New Zealand Order of Merit, for services to netball and volleyball.

References

External links
2011 Silver Ferns profile
2011 ANZ Championship profile

1983 births
Living people
New Zealand netball players
New Zealand beach volleyball players
New Zealand international netball players
Commonwealth Games gold medallists for New Zealand
Commonwealth Games silver medallists for New Zealand
Commonwealth Games medallists in netball
Netball players at the 2006 Commonwealth Games
Netball players at the 2010 Commonwealth Games
Netball players at the 2014 Commonwealth Games
2003 World Netball Championships players
2011 World Netball Championships players
Northern Mystics players
ANZ Championship players
People from Westport, New Zealand
New Zealand international Fast5 players
Northern Stars players
Members of the New Zealand Order of Merit
Medallists at the 2006 Commonwealth Games
Medallists at the 2010 Commonwealth Games
Medallists at the 2014 Commonwealth Games